Sphyrapodidae is a family of crustaceans belonging to the order Tanaidacea.

Genera:
 Ansphyrapus Gutu, 2001
 Francapseudes Bacescu, 1981
 Kudinopasternakia Gutu, 1991
 Poligarida Bamber & Marshall, 2013
 Pseudosphyrapus Gutu, 1980
 Sphyrapoides Gutu & Iliffe, 1998
 Sphyrapus Norman & Stebbing, 1886
 Sphyrapus Sars, 1882
 Wandogarida Wi & Kang, 2018

References

Tanaidacea
Crustacean families